Rándall Row Arias  (born 21 April 1971 in Turrialba) is a Costa Rican former footballer who played most of his career with Deportivo Saprissa, during the 1990s.

Club career
With Saprissa, he won several national championships, but also played for his native Turrialba, Herediano, Municipal Liberia and Cartaginés. Known for his small size and huge heart, he is remembered for being a very tough defender. He retired in 2004 after 14 years in the Primera División.

International career
Row made his debut for Costa Rica in a November 1991 friendly match against Brazil and earned a total of 16 caps, scoring 1 goal. He represented his country in 1 FIFA World Cup qualification match and played at the 1993 and 1999 UNCAF Nations Cups.

His final international was a March 1999 UNCAF Nations Cup match against El Salvador.

International goals
Scores and results list Costa Rica's goal tally first.

Managerial career
After retiring, he began a very successful coaching career inside Saprissa's minor league system, winning several national championships with his teams. Since Hernan Medford and his coaching staff were announced by the Federación Costarricense de Fútbol as the new coaches for the Costa Rica national football team, Jeaustin Campos was named by Saprissa as their new head coach, and Row was appointed as assistant coach. He was dismissed by Saprissa in September 2014, alongside manager Rónald González.

Personal life
Row is married to Gabriela Solano and they have three children, one of them being Randall Row Jr who also is a Costa Rican footballer who plays in Costa Rica’s second division for Sporting San José.

References

External links
 

1971 births
Living people
People from Cartago Province
Association football defenders
Costa Rican footballers
Deportivo Saprissa players
C.S. Herediano footballers
Municipal Liberia footballers
C.S. Cartaginés players
Costa Rican football managers
Deportivo Saprissa non-playing staff
Costa Rica international footballers